Morey Stanley Mosk (September 4, 1912 – June 19, 2001) was an American jurist, politician, and attorney. He served as Associate Justice of the California Supreme Court for 37 years (1964–2001), the longest tenure in that court's history.

Before sitting on the Supreme Court, he served as Attorney General of California and as a trial court judge.

Early life and career 
Mosk was born in San Antonio, Texas. His family moved to Rockford, Illinois when he was three years old. His parents Paul and Minna (née Perl) Mosk were Reform Jews (of Hungarian and German origin, respectively) who did not believe in strict religious observances.  Since Rockford sits next to the Wisconsin border, Mosk's parents followed Wisconsin politics and were strong supporters of Progressive Wisconsin Senator Robert M. La Follette.

Mosk's life was strongly affected by the Great Depression. Mosk graduated from the University of Chicago in 1933 with a bachelor's degree in philosophy. Because his father's business in Rockford was floundering, his parents and brother relocated to Los Angeles, and Mosk followed them after graduating from college, as they could not afford to support him in further studies in Chicago.

At the time, it was possible to use the last year of a bachelor's degree as the first year of a three-year law degree program, so while living with his parents, Mosk was able to obtain a law degree in two years. He earned a LL.B from Southwestern University School of Law in 1935 and was admitted to the bar that same year. Mosk opened a solo practice, sharing an office with four other separate solo practices. During those difficult years, Mosk was a general practitioner who took whatever walked in the door.

Entry to politics 
While practicing law, Mosk occasionally assisted Democratic politician Culbert Olson. In 1938, Olson was elected Governor of California and Mosk was hired as Olson's executive secretary the next year.

After Olson lost the 1942 election to Republican Earl Warren, Olson made a lame-duck appointment of Mosk to the Los Angeles County Superior Court. At the age of 31, Mosk became the youngest judge in the state. He faced opposition at his first retention election but prevailed.

In March 1945, Mosk left the Superior Court to volunteer for service in the U.S. Army during World War II as a private, but spent most of the war in a transportation unit in New Orleans and never went abroad.  After an honorable discharge in September 1945, he returned to California and resumed his judicial career.

In 1947, as a Superior Court judge, he declared the enforcement of restrictive racial covenants unconstitutional before the Supreme Court of the United States did so in Shelley v. Kraemer.

Attorney General of California
In 1958, Mosk was elected Attorney General of California by the largest margin of any contested election in the state that year. Upon his inauguration in 1959, Mosk became the first Jew to serve as a statewide executive branch officer in California. In 1962, he was re-elected by a large margin.

As Attorney General, Mosk issued approximately two thousand written opinions, handled a series of landmark cases, and on January 8, 1962, appeared before the U.S. Supreme Court in Arizona v. California.

Mosk established the Attorney General's Civil Rights Division and successfully fought to force the Professional Golfers' Association of America to amend its bylaws denying access to minority golfers. He also established Consumer Rights, Constitutional Rights, and Antitrust divisions. As California's chief law enforcement officer, he sponsored legislation creating the California Commission on Peace Officers' Standards and Training.

Mosk also commissioned a study of the resurgence of right-wing extremism in California, which famously characterized the secretive John Birch Society as a "cadre" of "wealthy businessmen, retired military officers and little old ladies in tennis shoes."

He served as the California National Committeeman to the Democratic National Committee and was an early supporter of John F. Kennedy for president. He remained close to the Kennedy family.

California Supreme Court 
While an early favorite to be elected to the United States Senate after the death of incumbent Clair Engle, Mosk was appointed to the California Supreme Court in September 1964 by Governor Pat Brown to succeed Roger J. Traynor, who had been elevated to chief justice. Mosk was retained by the electorate in 1964 and re-elected to three twelve-year terms beginning in 1974.

Although Mosk was a self-described liberal, he often displayed an independent streak that sometimes surprised his admirers and critics alike.  For example, in Bakke v. Regents of the University of California, Mosk ruled that the minority admissions program at the University of California, Davis violated the equal protection clause of the U.S. Constitution. This decision was affirmed by the U.S. Supreme Court in Regents of the University of California v. Bakke, 438 U.S. 265 (1978), which, unlike Mosk's opinion, held that race could be factored in admissions to promote ethnic diversity. The U.S. Supreme Court agreed with Mosk in rejecting racial quotas. He also voted to uphold the constitutionality of a parental consent for abortion law — a law ultimately struck down by a majority of the court.

Despite his liberalism, he was not a close ally of controversial Chief Justice Rose Bird. He won reelection in 1986 with 75% of the vote while Bird and two other justices closely allied with her were defeated for reelection. In November 1998, at age 86, Mosk was retained by the electorate for another twelve-year term.

Although personally opposed to the death penalty, Mosk voted to uphold death penalty convictions on a number of occasions. He believed he was obligated to enforce laws properly enacted by the people of the state of California, even though he personally did not approve of such laws. A typical example of how Mosk articulated his beliefs is his concurrence in In re Anderson, 69 Cal. 2d 613 (1968):

Mosk served on the high court until his death in 2001, having surpassed Justice John W. Shenk to become the longest-serving justice in the history of the Court in 1999. As of 2021, Mosk is the last Justice of the California Supreme Court to have served in non-judicial elected office before his appointment to the bench.

Personal life 
Mosk married three times. On September 27, 1936, he married Helen Edna Mitchell in Beverly Hills, California, and they had one son, Richard. After her death on May 22, 1981, he remarried on August 27, 1982, to Susan Jane Hines in Reno, Nevada, who was more than 30 years his junior. They divorced and on January 15, 1995, Mosk married Kaygey Kash, a long-time friend.

His son, Richard M. Mosk, became an attorney and justice of the California Court of Appeal, Second District.

Legacy 

In 1999, Albany Law School Professor Vincent Martin Bonventre described Mosk as "an institution, an icon, a trailblazer, a legal scholar, a constitutional guardian, a veritable living legend of the American judiciary, ... one of the most influential members in the history of one of the most influential tribunals in the western world."

One of Mosk's contributions to jurisprudence was development of the constitutional doctrine of independent state grounds. This is the concept that individual rights are not dependent solely on interpretation of the U.S. Constitution by the U.S. Supreme Court and other federal courts, but also can be found in state constitutions, which often provide greater protection for individuals.

Honors and memorials 
The Stanley Mosk Courthouse, housing the Los Angeles County Superior Court, is named after him. It is located at 111 North Hill Street in Los Angeles.

The Stanley Mosk Library & Courts Building is located on the Capitol Mall in Sacramento, California and is the home of the California Court of Appeal for the Third District.

In popular culture 
A billboard for Mosk's reelection campaign for Attorney General is featured during the final car chase scene in the 1963 film It's a Mad, Mad, Mad, Mad World, which was filmed in Long Beach, California in 1962.

Selected publications

Books

Articles

See also
 List of justices of the Supreme Court of California

References

Further reading
 
 Uelmen, Gerald F. (June 22, 2002). "Tribute to Justice Stanley Mosk", 65 Albany Law Review 857. Retrieved September 25, 2017.

External links
 Stanley Mosk. California Supreme Court Historical Society.
 Stanley Mosk, Oral History interview (PDF). Regional Oral History Office, University of California, Berkeley, 1998.
 Opinions authored by Stanley Mosk. Courtlistener.com.
 Stanley Mosk at U.S. Supreme Court. Oyez.com.
 Past & Present Justices. California State Courts.

Video 
 Oral argument before the California Supreme Court (October 11, 1991), on the constitutionality of Proposition 140 which would impose term limits on elected officials. C-SPAN.

1912 births
2001 deaths
20th-century American judges
California Attorneys General
California Democrats
Jewish American attorneys
Jewish American people in California politics
Justices of the Supreme Court of California
Lawyers from Los Angeles
People from Rockford, Illinois
Southwestern Law School alumni
Superior court judges in the United States
United States Army soldiers
American scholars of constitutional law
University of California regents
University of Chicago alumni
United States Army personnel of World War II